Clowns Spinning Hats is a black-and-white silent film featuring clowns throwing hats back and forth to each other. It was written and produced by Lubin Films and released April 7, 1900.

See also
 List of American films of 1900
Lubin Studios
Silent film
Clown

External links

1900 films
American silent short films
American black-and-white films
1900 comedy films
Silent American comedy films
1900 short films
Comedy films about clowns
Lubin Manufacturing Company films
American comedy short films
1900s American films